This list of the presidents of the American Bar Association includes all  presidents of the association, which was formed in 1878 to represent the interests of lawyers, and create and maintain a code of ethics. Since 1923, the ABA has accredited law schools. The American Bar Association is a voluntary bar association of lawyers and law students not specific to any jurisdiction in the United States.

The association comprises 410,000 members, who are represented by a House of Delegates, the organization's primary body, which acts to create and adopt new policies and recommendations pertaining to the practice of law. The House of Delegates and the association itself are headed by the President, who generally serves a one-year term.

Presidents

References
Sobel, Robert. Biographical Directory of the United States Executive Branch, 1774-1889. Greenwood Press (1990). .

Notes and references

American Bar Association